Erinle is a surname. Notable people with the surname include:

 Ayoola Erinle (born 1980), English rugby union player
 Folu Erinle (born 1940), Nigerian hurdler
 Titus Erinle (1927–?), Nigerian sprinter